Aalto is a Finnish surname meaning "wave". Notable people with the surname include:

 Aino Aalto (1894–1949), Finnish architect and designer
 Alec Aalto (1942–2018), Finnish diplomat
 Alvar Aalto (1898–1976), Finnish architect and designer
 Antti Aalto (born 1975), Finnish ice hockey player
 Artturi Aalto (1876–1937), Finnish politician
 Arvo Aalto (born 1932), Finnish politician 
 Ashprihanal Pekka Aalto (born 1970), Finnish runner
 Einari Aalto (1926–1985), Finnish swimmer
 Elissa Aalto (1922–1994), Finnish architect
 Henri Aalto (born 1989), Finnish football player
 Iiro Aalto (born 1977), Finnish footballer
 Ilmari Aalto (1891–1934), Finnish painter
 Jorma Aalto (born 1957), Finnish skier
 Jussi Aalto (born 1983), Finnish footballer
 Jyri Aalto (born 1969), Finnish badminton player
 Kalle Aalto (1884–1950), Finnish politician
 Kathryn Aalto, American landscape designer
 Marja-Sisko Aalto (born 1954) Finnish minister of the Evangelical Lutheran Church
 Marjatta Aalto (born 1939), Finnish mycologist
 Minna Aalto (born 1965), Finnish sailor
 Pauliina Aalto (born 1967), Finnish ten-pin bowling player
 Pentti Aalto (1917–1998), Finnish linguist
 Pirjo Aalto (born 1961), Finnish biathlete
 Saara Aalto (born 1987), Finnish singer
 Simo Aalto (born 1960), Finnish stage magician
 Teemu Aalto (born 1978), Finnish ice hockey player
 Toivo Aalto-Setälä (1896–1977), Finnish lawyer and politician
 Touko Aalto (born 1984), Finnish politician
 William Aalto (1915–1958), American soldier, member of the Lincoln Battalion

See also 
 Aalto-1, Finnish student satellite developed in Aalto University.
 Aalto Theatre, opera house in Essen, Germany, designed by Alvar Aalto
 Aalto University, Finnish university, named after Alvar Aalto
 Aalto Vase, glassware designed by Aino and Alvar Aalto

References

Finnish-language surnames